Sean Masterson is a comedy actor, writer, director and producer known for his work with Drew Carey, writing on The Drew Carey Show, and as an improvisational performer on Whose Line Is It Anyway?, Drew Carey's Green Screen Show, and Drew Carey's Improv-A-Ganza. He has a wife and two children and he is currently living in Los Angeles, California.

Personal life
Masterson was raised in Los Angeles and began his career at the age of six when he appeared in a Count Chocula / Frankenberry television commercial, directed by Bill Melendez.

After graduating high school in Los Angeles and acting in commercials, daytime serials, and school plays, Masterson briefly attended college.  He later moved to Chicago to begin pursuing an acting career. After bartending and working odd jobs for nine months, he was hired by The Second City, where he worked on stage with Mike Myers, Steve Carell and Bonnie Hunt. Masterson started working with Ryan Stiles and Drew Carey upon returning to Los Angeles, performing live improvisational comedy as a part of "The Improv All Stars".

Masterson created and co-wrote the web show "Home Purchasing Club" (HPC) for VH1/Spike, which ran for two seasons and featured Kristen Wiig, Jeff Garlin, Diedrich Bader, and David Keochner. HPC was directed by Brian K. Roberts and executive produced by Jordan Levin, Pete Aronson and Generate.

Masterson created, wrote and directed "Republicrats" for MSN (Microsoft), portraying a former Fresno TV weatherman who decides to run for President of the United States against John McCain and Barack Obama. Republicrats was reviewed by The Wall Street Journal, The Hollywood Reporter and TV Week as a Top Web Show of 2008. Republicrats was produced by Ivana Ma and Generate.

Masterson was named a top ten web producer to watch by TV Week.

Masterson has teamed up with Ryan Stiles to write and produce a half-hour comedy pilot called "Memory Lanes", directed by Brian K. Roberts and produced by Masterson, Styles, and Richard Elwood.

Filmography
Masterson is known best for his appearances in improvisational shows Drew Carey's Green Screen Show, and Drew Carey's Improv-A-Ganza. He has appeared in numerous TV series apart from the two Whose Line Is It Anyway? spin-offs.

Video games

References

External links 
Republicrats website
http://www.comedianbookings.com/comedians/comedian-sean-masterson-appearance-booking-agent.php
 

Year of birth missing (living people)
Living people
Writers from New York City
American male comedians
Comedians from New York City